Maurice McVeigh was a footballer from Northern Ireland who played with Glenavon from 1948. Nicknamed "Twinkle Toes", he was a member of Glenavon's first-ever Irish League championship teams. A shipyard worker from Belfast, he won 11 amateur international caps for Northern Ireland and one inter-league cap for the Irish League. He was the Ulster Footballer of the Year for the 1954–55 season.

References

Association footballers from Northern Ireland
NIFL Premiership players
Ulster Footballers of the Year
Glenavon F.C. players
Association footballers from Belfast
Northern Ireland amateur international footballers
Association footballers not categorized by position
Year of birth missing